Wahydra is a genus of skippers in the family Hesperiidae.  it consists of 15 species, including:

 Wahydra graslieae 
 Wahydra kenava

References

Natural History Museum Lepidoptera genus database

Hesperiinae
Hesperiidae genera